Nehatu may refer to several places in Estonia:

Nehatu, Harju County, village in Jõelähtme Parish, Harju County
Nehatu, Lääne County, village in Hanila Parish, Lääne County
Nehatu, part of Aa village, Lüganuse Parish, Ida-Viru County